Goodbye Hayabusa II: Last Match was a professional wrestling pay-per-view (PPV) event produced by Frontier Martial-Arts Wrestling (FMW). The event took place on August 25, 1999, at the Nakajima Sports Center in Sapporo, Japan. The pay-per-view was the last event in the Goodbye Hayabusa tour used to retire Eiji Ezaki's "Hayabusa" character and to showcase the character's final matches. The tour was used as a build-up to Hayabusa's new character "H", which was tested during Darkside Hayabusa's revival at Haunted House and Ezaki would debut his H character on August 27.

The event was notable for featuring the final defenses of the FMW Brass Knuckles Heavyweight Championship and the FMW Independent Heavyweight Championship. Masato Tanaka retained the Independent Heavyweight Championship against Yukihiro Kanemura and Hayabusa retained the Brass Knuckles Heavyweight Championship against his arch rival Mr. Gannosuke in the main event of Last Match, which was the last match of the "Hayabusa" character.

Results

References

1999 in professional wrestling
FMW Goodbye Hayabusa
August 1999 events in Asia
Events in Sapporo
Professional wrestling in Japan